Livrés chez vous sans contact ("Delivered to You Without Contact") is a Canadian comedy film, directed by Gaëlle d'Ynglemare and released in 2021. Starring the sketch comedy duo of Jean-Marie Corbeil and François Maranda, the film consists of a selection of comedy sketches, wrapped by a fictional frame story in which the duo respond to the lockdowns associated with the COVID-19 pandemic in Canada by setting up their own sketch comedy delivery service to perform sketches for people at their homes.

The film's cast also includes Michel Courtemanche, France Castel, Anne Casabonne and Luc Senay.

The film was conceived in 2020, after Corbeil and Maranda's real comedy tour was halted by the pandemic shutdowns, and was shot in the summer of 2020. The duo have described the film as inspired by the popularity of sketch comedy films in their childhoods, particularly those of Monty Python.

Following the reopening of public spaces in 2021, the film premiered theatrically on June 18, 2021. Some physical screenings were also presented as "double features", in which the screening was preceded or followed by Corbeil and Maranda performing a live stage show.

References

External links

2021 films
2021 comedy films
Canadian comedy films
Films shot in Quebec
Films set in Quebec
Films about the COVID-19 pandemic
Sketch comedy films
French-language Canadian films
2020s Canadian films